Phricta aberrans is a species of spiny tropical forest katydid native to northern New South Wales and southeast Queensland, Australia.

References

Tettigoniidae
Insects described in 1895
Orthoptera of Australia